James Griswold Merrill (c. 1840–1920) was an American Congregational minister and university administrator. He was the second president of Fisk University, a historically black university in Nashville, Tennessee, from 1901 to 1908.

Early life
James Griswold Merrill was born in Montague, Massachusetts. He graduated from Phillips Academy Andover and Amherst College. He subsequently attended the Princeton Theological Seminary from 1863 to 1864, and graduated from the Andover Theological Seminary in 1866.

Career
Merrill was a Congregational minister in Iowa, Kansas, St. Louis, Missouri, Portland, Maine and Somerset, Massachusetts. He retired as minister after serving in Lake Helen, Florida from 1912 to 1917. In Portland, Maine from 1894 to 1899, he was also the editor of The Christian Mirror.

Merrill was the acting president of Fisk University, a historically black university in Nashville, Tennessee, from 1899 to 1901, and its second president from 1901 to 1908. An article in The Nashville Globe noted that he spent most of his time fundraising away from Nashville. It also explained, "Dr. Merrill's interest in the education of the Negro springs not from a love of the Negro as a Negro, but from the love of the Negro as one of God's children; and this is simple Christianity."

Personal life and death
Merrill married Louisa W. Boutwell. He died on December 22, 1920, in Mountain Lakes, New Jersey. He was buried in Andover, Massachusetts.

Selected works

References

1920 deaths
People from Montague, Massachusetts
Amherst College alumni
Princeton Theological Seminary alumni
Presidents of Fisk University
American Congregationalist ministers
19th-century Congregationalist ministers
20th-century Congregationalist ministers
20th-century American clergy
19th-century American clergy
1840s births